Kaino Kalervo Nissilä (11 July 1913 – 30 March 1997) was a Finnish actor and a theatre leader. He is best remembered for such films as Härmästä poikia kymmenen (1950), Sadan miekan mies and Valkoinen peura (1952).

Nissilä was also known as a singer. He gave concerts around Finland  and made a guest appearance at the Finnish National Opera.

Filmography 
Härmästä poikia kymmenen (1950)
Sadan miekan mies (1951)
Kuisma ja Helinä (1951)
Valkoinen peura (1952)
Yksityisalue (1962)
Naiset, jotka minulle annoit (1962)
Villin Pohjolan kulta (1963)
Rakkaus alkaa aamuyöstä (1966)
Tammenlehvät (1991) as director

References

External links 
 

1913 births
1997 deaths
People from Kokkola
People from Vaasa Province (Grand Duchy of Finland)
Finnish male film actors
20th-century Finnish male actors